Acropora latistella  is a species of Acropora polyp coral found in tropical reefs in the Indo-Pacific Ocean from depths ranging from 3 – 20 meters.

References

External links
 
 

Acropora